John Walshe may refer to:
John Walshe (cricketer), Australian cricketer
John Walshe (MP) for Cricklade
John Walshe (rugby league), rugby league footballer

See also
John Walsh (disambiguation)